Fuchsia arborescens, commonly known as the tree fuchsia, is a tree of the genus Fuchsia native to Central America. It belongs to the section Schufia and is most closely related to Fuchsia paniculata.

References

External links

arborescens
Flora of Central America